Rafael Mariano Grossi (born 29 January 1961) is an Argentine diplomat. He has served as Director General of the International Atomic Energy Agency (IAEA) since December 3, 2019. He was formerly the Argentine Ambassador to Austria, concurrent with Slovenia, Slovakia and International Organisations based in Vienna (2013–2019).

Biography

Early life and studies 
In 1983 he graduated from the Pontifical Catholic University of Argentina with a BA in Political Sciences, and in 1985 Grossi joined the Argentine foreign service. In 1997 he graduated from the University of Geneva and the Graduate Institute of International Studies with an MA and PhD in History, International Relations and International Politics.

Career

Grossi began working in the nuclear policy during a collaboration between the Argentine foreign service and INVAP. Between 1997 and 2000 he was the President of the United Nations Group of Government Experts on the International Weapons Registry, and later became adviser to the Assistant Secretary-General of the United Nations on disarmament.

From 2002 to 2007 he was Chief of Staff of the International Atomic Energy Agency and the Organisation for the Prohibition of Chemical Weapons. While working for the United Nations, Grossi visited North Korea's nuclear facilities and participated in several meetings with representatives of Iran to reach an agreement to freeze its nuclear program.

During his work for the Argentine foreign service, he was the General Director of Political Coordination of the Ministry of Foreign Affairs and Worship, Ambassador to Belgium and the Argentine Representative to the United Nations Office at Geneva. Between 2010 and 2013 he served as Deputy Director General of the International Atomic Energy Agency, and that last year, President Cristina Fernández de Kirchner assigned him as Ambassador to Austria and International Organisations based in Vienna, concurrent also in Slovakia and Slovenia.

In September 2015, the Argentine government announced the nomination of Grossi as a candidate for Director General of the IAEA, with support from other countries in Latin America and the Caribbean. In 2016, however, the government of Mauricio Macri withdrew its support to promote Susana Malcorra's candidacy as UN Secretary General. In 2016, he was the President of the Nuclear Suppliers Group.

In 2017, President Macri announced that he would nominate Grossi for the presidency of the Review Conference of the Treaty on the Non-Proliferation of Nuclear Weapons to be held in 2020.

Contribution to the search of ARA San Juan 
In November 2017, after the disappearance of ARA San Juan, Grossi had the idea of reviewing the records of the hydro-acoustic stations of the Comprehensive Nuclear-Test-Ban Treaty Organization (CTBTO) as an alternative to obtain clues about what happened with the submarine. He contacted Lassina Zerbo, the Executive Secretary of the CTBTO, and convinced him of doing such reviews. The remains of the ill-fated ship were found a year later, about twenty kilometers from the estimated position based on the cited records.

Director General of IAEA 
On August 2, 2019, Grossi was presented as the Argentine candidate to become the Director General of IAEA. On 28 October, 2019, the IAEA Board of Governors held its first vote to elect the new Director General, but none of the candidates secure the two-thirds majority in the 35-member IAEA Board of Governors needed to be elected. The next day, 29 October, the second voting round was held, and Grossi won 24 of the 23 needed votes required for Director General Appointment, and became the first Latin American to head the organisation. He assumed office on 3 December 2019. In August 2022, Grossi led a team of IAEA inspectors to the Zaporizhzhia Nuclear Power Plant ‎in Russian-occupied southern Ukraine. Since 2022, Grossi had been in the spotlight to obtain information on nuclear materials from Iran to re-negotiate the JCPOA. In September 2022, he continued to express concerns about traces of uranium found at three Iranian nuclear sites. Grossi told a press conference in Vienna that he is "under political pressure". Iran has long denied that it seeks nuclear weapons for defense purposes.

Publications
 Penúltima alianza: el proceso de expansión de la OTAN y el nuevo mapa de la seguridad internacional. Buenos Aires: Grupo Editor Latinoamericano (1999).
 Kosovo, los límites del intervencionismo humanitario. Buenos Aires: Editorial Nuevohacer (2000).

References

External links

 IAEA Director General's Corner

1961 births
Argentine officials of the United Nations
Directors General of the International Atomic Energy Agency
Graduate Institute of International and Development Studies alumni
Living people
Nuclear proliferation
People associated with nuclear power
Pontifical Catholic University of Argentina alumni